The Slovenian Football Cup is the top knockout tournament of Slovenian football and the second most important football competition in Slovenia after the Slovenian PrvaLiga championship. The cup was established in 1991 following the breakup of Yugoslavia. Since 2020, it has been known as Pokal Pivovarna Union after its headline sponsor, the Union Brewery.

As of 2022, a total of 17 clubs have reached the cup final; the most successful side in the history of the competition is Maribor, who have triumphed 9 times in their 14 cup final appearances. They are followed by Olimpija and Koper, who both won four titles. Primorje hold the record for most appearances in the final without winning the title, finishing as runners-up in three consecutive finals between 1996 and 1998. Aluminij and Nafta 1903 are the only sides from outside the top flight which managed to reach the cup final, having finished as runners-up in 2002 and 2020, respectively.

Koper are the defending champions, having beaten Bravo 3–1 in the 2022 final.

Format
From the 2022–23 season onwards, the number of teams in the first round has increased from 24 to 120, and any registered team in the country can participate in the preliminary rounds. Four teams that represent Slovenia in UEFA competitions joins the competition in the second round. Only one match is played in all rounds, with extra time and penalty shoot-out if necessary. The draw is no longer delegated with seeded and unseeded teams, and lower league teams no longer automatically play at home.

Until 2021, the Slovenian Cup was contested by a total of 28 clubs: 18 lower league sides that qualified via regional cups organised by the Intercommunal Football Associations, and 10 teams that competed in the Slovenian PrvaLiga the previous season. In the first round proper, 18 lower league clubs were joined by the six lower placed top flight clubs. The twelve winners were then joined by the best four top flight clubs who automatically entered the second round proper. The games were played in a single leg knock-out format until the quarter-finals and semi-finals when home and away matches were played and aggregate scores were taken into account. Since 2005 the final is also held as a single-legged match, although it was a two-legged affair in the period between 1994 and 2004.

List of finals

Key

List of winners
Teams shown in italics are no longer in existence.

Notes

References

External links
Slovenian Cup at NZS 
Slovenian Cup at Rec.Sport.Soccer Statistics Foundation

 

 
1
Slovenia
1991 establishments in Slovenia